Piecewo may refer to the following places:
Piecewo, Greater Poland Voivodeship (west-central Poland)
Piecewo, Kuyavian-Pomeranian Voivodeship (north-central Poland)
Piecewo, Pomeranian Voivodeship (north Poland)